Soner Cagaptay (born in 1970) is a Turkish-American political scientist based in the United States. He is director of the Turkish Research Program at the Washington Institute for Near East Policy. He is a historian by training and is an expert on Turkey–United States relations, Turkish politics, and Turkish nationalism.

Education
Cagaptay received his Ph.D. degree in history from Yale University in 2003. He wrote his doctoral dissertation on Turkish nationalism. Besides English and Turkish, his research languages include French, German, Spanish, Bosnian, Hebrew, Azerbaijani, and Ottoman Turkish.

Career
Cagaptay is the Beyer Family fellow and director of the Turkish Research Program at The Washington Institute for Near East Policy (WINEP).

Cagaptay has taught courses at Yale, Princeton University, Georgetown University, and Smith College on the Middle East, Mediterranean, and Eastern Europe. From 2006-2007, he was Ertegun Professor at Princeton University's Department of Near Eastern Studies.

He was a visiting professor at the Edmund A. Walsh School of Foreign Service at Georgetown University.

He has also served on contract as chair of the Turkey Advanced Area Studies Program at the State Department's Foreign Service Institute.

Cagaptay has received the Smith-Richardson, Mellon, Rice, and Leylan fellowships. 

In 2012 he was named an American Turkish Society Young Society Leader. He is the author of four books on modern Turkey.

In the media
Cagaptay has written extensively on Turkey–United States relations; Turkish domestic politics; Turkish nationalism; Turkey's rise as an economic power and Ankara's Middle East policy, publishing in scholarly journals and international print media including the Wall Street Journal, New York Times, Washington Times, International Herald Tribune, Jane's Defence Weekly, and Habertürk. He is a regular columnist for Hürriyet Daily News, Turkey's oldest English-language paper, and a contributor to CNN's Global Public Square blog. He appears regularly in interviews and documentaries speaking with Voice of America, CNN, NPR, BBC, al-Jazeera, CNBC, PBS, and Fox News. His latest book, Erdogan's Empire: Turkey and the Politics of the Middle East was published in September 2019 by I.B. Tauris. On February 16, 2022, he testified at a Helsinki Commission briefing entitled "Conflict of Interest? Foreign Policy and Human Rights in Turkey."

Books
Çaǧaptay, Soner. (2021). A Sultan in Autumn: Erdogan Faces Turkey's Uncontainable Forces. London. .
Çaǧaptay, Soner. (2019). Erdogan's Empire: Turkey and the Politics of the Middle East. London. . OCLC 1121097111
Çaǧaptay, Soner. (2017). The New Sultan: Erdogan and the Crisis of Modern Turkey. London. . OCLC 974880239.
Çaǧaptay, Soner. (2014). The Rise of Turkey: The Twenty-first Century's First Muslim power. Lincoln. . OCLC 869736354
Cagaptay, Soner. (2006). Islam, Secularism and Nationalism in Modern Turkey: Who is a Turk?. Milton: Taylor & Francis. . OCLC 1027167702

Academic papers 

 Cagaptay, Soner (2013). "Defining Turkish Power: Turkey as a Rising Power Embedded in the Western International System". Turkish Studies. 14 (4): 797–811. doi:10.1080/14683849.2013.861110. ISSN 1468-3849
 Cagaptay, Soner (2007). "Race, Assimilation and Kemalism: Turkish Nationalism and the Minorities in the 1930s". Middle Eastern Studies. 40 (3): 86–101. doi:10.1080/0026320042000213474. ISSN 0026-3206
 Çağaptay, Soner (2007). "Reconfiguring the Turkish nation in the 1930s". Nationalism and Ethnic Politics. 8 (2): 67–82. doi:10.1080/13537110208428662. ISSN 1353-7113
 Çağaptay, Soner (2003). "Citizenship policies in interwar Turkey*". Nations and Nationalism. 9 (4): 601–619. doi:10.1111/1469-8219.00129. ISSN 1469-8129

References

External links
 Soner Cagaptay's personal website

The Washington Institute for Near East Policy
Living people
21st-century Turkish male writers
Georgetown University faculty
Yale University faculty
Yale Graduate School of Arts and Sciences alumni
1970 births
Turkish emigrants to the United States
Turkish political scientists